The Escape Orbit (British title: Open Prison) is a science fiction novel by northern Irish author James White, first published in 1964 in the magazine New Worlds. It was a finalist at the Nebula Award.

It tells the story of a human, Warren, who is abandoned on a prison planet by an alien race, the Bugs, who are warring against Earth. Here he finds a society created by the other human prisoners. To avoid a civil war between the factions which have formed by the years, he organizes a successful escape from the planet.

1964 British novels
1964 science fiction novels
British science fiction novels
Novels by James White (author)
Novels first published in serial form
Ace Books books
Works originally published in New Worlds (magazine)